Franciszek Krzyształowicz (1868 - 1931) was a Polish dermatologist. He served as the rector of the University of Warsaw from 1924 to 1925. In 1919 he became the professor and head of dermatology at the University of Warsaw. He was one of the founders of the Polish Dermatological Society, and from 1927 to 1930 he was its chairman.

Polish dermatologists
1868 births
1931 deaths